Symplocos hispidula is a species of plant in the family Symplocaceae. It is endemic to Sri Lanka.

References

Endemic flora of Sri Lanka
hispidula
Vulnerable plants
Taxonomy articles created by Polbot